British Library, Add MS 12140 is a Syriac manuscript of the New Testament, on parchment. Palaeographically it had been assigned to the 6th century. It is a manuscript of Peshitta. The manuscript is a lacunose.

Description 

It contains the text of the four Gospels, on 196 parchment leaves (10 ⅞ by 8 ¾ inches), with some lacunae (Matthew 26:7-28; Mark 10:45-11:1). Folio 3 b was supplemented by a later scribe, but scribe wrote more than was necessary to connect with folio 4, in result Matthew 2:4-6 is repeated.

Written in two columns per page, in 23-26 lines per page. The writing is a fine bold Estrangela. Folio 2, 3, and 5 written in inelegant, angular hand from about the 11th century. Folio 133 is a paper leaf of still later date, with writing on one side only. The manuscript has many notes added by a later hand. On folio 1 b, 2 a, and 133 b it has some Arabic notes.

The manuscript is housed at the British Library (Add MS 12140) in London.

See also 

 List of the Syriac New Testament manuscripts
 Syriac versions of the Bible
 Biblical manuscript
 Codex Phillipps 1388
 British Library, Add MS 14479

References

Further reading 

 William Wright, Catalogue of the Syriac manuscripts in the British Museum (1870; reprint: Gorgias Press 2002).

External links 

 William Wright, Catalogue of the Syriac manuscripts in the British Museum

Peshitta manuscripts
6th-century biblical manuscripts
Add. 12140